Remanufacture – Cloning Technology (sometimes referred to as Remanufacture) is a remix album of Fear Factory's second album Demanufacture, released on May 20, 1997.

The tracks "Genetic Blueprint" (New Breed) and "21st Century Jesus" (Pisschrist) are featured on Infogrames Test Drive 5 which was released on PC and PlayStation in 1998. Additionally, the song "Remanufacture (Demanufacture)" is featured on the 2000 PC game Messiah, as it is the theme song for the game, and the song is also on 2005 PSP video game Infected.

Track listing
The titles of the original songs are in bigger brackets. All songs composed by Burton C. Bell, Dino Cazares and Raymond Herrera.

Japanese Bonus Track

Disc two bonus tracks

2005 remastered edition
The album was re-released on June 7, 2005 in a digipak edition, with new bonus tracks and Demanufacture as the first disc.

Personnel

Fear Factory
Fear Factory – production, cover design
Burton C. Bell – vocals
Dino Cazares – guitar, production
Christian Olde Wolbers – bass
Raymond Herrera – drums

Other personal 
Delwyn Brooks – mixing assistant
Ciel – artwork, design
Anne Marie Damjanovic – production coordination
Rhys Fulber – remixing
Ted Jensen – mastering
Junkie XL – producer, remixing
Kingsize – remixing
DJ Dano – remixing
Greg Reely – producer, mixing
Colin Richardson – producer
Cristian Wicha – design

Charts
Album - Billboard (United States)

References

Fear Factory albums
1997 albums
1997 remix albums
Roadrunner Records remix albums
Albums produced by Greg Reely

es:Demanufacture#Remanufacture